Ostrów Wielki is a village in the administrative district of Gmina Miłomłyn, within Ostróda County, Warmian-Masurian Voivodeship, in northern Poland.

The village has a population of 15.

References

Villages in Ostróda County